Forkville is an unincorporated community in Scott County, Mississippi, United States. Forkville had a post office until March 19, 1994.

References

Unincorporated communities in Scott County, Mississippi
Unincorporated communities in Mississippi